SS Thomas Sully was a Liberty ship built in the United States during World War II. She was named after Thomas Sully, an American portrait painter.

Construction
Thomas Sully was laid down on 16 June 1943, under a Maritime Commission (MARCOM) contract, MC hull 1205, by the St. Johns River Shipbuilding Company, Jacksonville, Florida; she was sponsored by Mildred Pepper, the wife of Claude Pepper, then Floridas junior United States senator, and launched on 11 September 1943.

History
She was allocated to the Calmar Steamship Corp., on 27 September 1943. On 18 May 1946, she was placed in the Hudson River Reserve Fleet, Jones Point, New York. She was placed in the National Defense Reserve Fleet, Wilmington, North Carolina, 5 November 1946. She was sold for commercial use, 30 January 1947, to Neptune Shipping, Ltd., for $544,506. She was withdrawn from the fleet, 17 February 1947.

Thomas Sully was renamed Actor and reflagged in Panama, in 1947. She was sold in 1949, to Sicilia Soc. di Nav. and reflagged in Italy, and renamed Citta Di Palermo. She was scrapped in 1963.

References

Bibliography

 
 
 
 

 

Liberty ships
Ships built in Jacksonville, Florida
1943 ships
Hudson River Reserve Fleet
Wilmington Reserve Fleet
Liberty ships transferred to Italy